Manastirica is a village in the Prizren Municipality in southern Kosovo, close to the border between Kosovo and North Macedonia.

History
The village of Manastirica was settled by construction workers who took part in the construction of the Visoki Dečani Monastery in the early 1300s. As a sign of gratitude for their work, these workers were gifted the village of Manastirica to settle by the Serbian king Stefan Dečanski following completion of the build.

Demographics 
The village is almost exclusively inhabited by Bosniaks.

Notes and references 

Notes:

References:

 

Villages in Prizren